Mandisi Mabuto Bongani Mpahlwa was the Minister of Trade and Industry under South African President Thabo Mbeki, from 2004 to 2008.

References

See also

African Commission on Human and Peoples' Rights
Constitution of South Africa
History of the African National Congress
Politics in South Africa
Provincial governments of South Africa

Living people
Government ministers of South Africa
Year of birth missing (living people)